Walnut Park East is a neighborhood of St. Louis, Missouri.  Walnut Park East is one of several neighborhoods in northwest St. Louis. Its borders are West Florissant Avenue (Calvary Cemetery) to the northeast, Emerson Avenue to the southeast, Interstate 70 (I-70) to the southwest and west, and Riverview Boulevard to the northwest.

Education

Northwest High School
Northwest Junior High School
Walnut Park Elementary School
Aspire Academy

Demographics
In 2020 Walnut Park East's racial makeup was 93.9% Black, 3.4% Two or More Races, 1.4% White, 0.1% Native American, and 0.6% Some Other Race. 1.6% of the people were of Hispanic or Latino origin.

References

Neighborhoods in St. Louis